Coleman Alexander Young II (born October 18, 1982) is a former Democratic member of the Michigan Senate, who represented the 1st district, which includes the municipalities of Ecorse, Gibraltar, River Rouge, Riverview, Trenton, Woodhaven, Wyandotte and a portion of Detroit. He served as the vice chair of the Local Government and Elections Committee, General Government Appropriations Subcommittee, Judiciary Appropriations Subcommittee, Licensing And Regulatory Affairs Appropriations Subcommittee and Transportation Appropriations Subcommittee. Young also sat on the Appropriations Committee and Insurance Committee. He previously served as the vice chair of the Outdoor Recreation and Tourism Committee and Reforms, Restructuring and Reinventing Committee, as well as having previously served on the Banking and Financial Institutions Committee, Education Committee and Energy and Technology Committee. From 2011 to 2014, Young served as the Senate Assistant Minority Caucus Chair and also served as the Senate Assistant Minority Floor Leader.

From 2007 to 2010, Young served as the representative in the 4th District of the Michigan House of Representatives. The 4th District is composed of the Lower East Side of Detroit, including a portion of Downtown and Midtown. During his time in the House, Young served as the vice chair of the Insurance Committee and sat on the Intergovernmental and Regional Affairs Committee, Labor Committee and Transportation Committee.

On Monday, December 11, 2017, Young announced his campaign for Michigan's 13th Congressional District. The seat was vacant, due to the resignation of John Conyers. Young lost the 2018 primary to Rashida Tlaib, who won the general election.

Personal life
Coleman Young II was born in Royal Oak, Michigan. He is the only son of former Detroit Mayor Coleman Young and former Assistant Public Works Director Annivory Calvert. He was born Joel Loving, and raised in California, his father denying his existence until a paternity suit in 1989. Young says that the move and name change were due to death threats against his father. Later, Young, Sr. had Michigan courts restore Young's name to match his baptismal records. In 1995, a new birth certificate was issued bearing the name Coleman A. Young Jr. Young says he received a phone call from his father at the age of twelve wherein his father asked him to carry on the Coleman Young name and legacy.

In 2005, Young returned to Detroit, where he currently resides. He is a member of St. Paul Church of God in Christ.

Since July 2005, Young has hosted The "Young Effect," a weekly talk show broadcast Sunday evenings, on WHPR (Channel 91 Comcast) and simulcast on 88.1 FM. The show is a live, uncensored, call-in show. Each week Young covers community issues and provides updates on activities at the Capitol. He follows the broadcast show with a thirty-minute Town Hall Meeting on his Facebook page.

Education
Young graduated from P.A.L. Charter Academy High School in San Bernardino, California. After graduating High School, he enrolled at Azusa Pacific University, a private Christian college in Azusa, California. In 2005, Young transferred to Wayne State University, to complete his Bachelor of Arts in communications.  As of 2018, Young attends Wayne State as a part-time student.

Political career

In 2005, Young worked as an intern for Detroit City Councilwoman JoAnn Watson. He has also worked for the Detroit City Council Research & Analysis Division.

In the 2006 Primary Election, Young ran to fill a vacancy in the 4th District of Michigan's House of Representatives. He led a field of sixteen candidates to win the Democratic nomination. Young defeated Republican Scott Withington with over 93 percent of the vote in the general election.

In 2008, Young won the Primary with over 70 percent of the vote. He was unopposed in the general election.

Young won election to the Michigan State Senate in 2010. In the August Primary Election, he bested former Michigan House member Mary D. Waters. In the November General Election, he defeated Republican Dakeisha Harwick.

Young ran unopposed in the 2014 Democratic primary election. He defeated Republican Barry Berk in the general election.

In 2017, Young ran an aggressive Primary campaign against fellow Democrat, Detroit Mayor Mike Duggan, but came up short in his bid to unseat him. Duggan won the November General Election with 72 percent of the vote, compared to 28 percent for Young.

Legislative achievements

Young has sponsored twelve bills that have become law since first elected the Michigan House in 2007, more than any other member of the Detroit Caucus. During his tenure in the Michigan Legislature, Young has also had eleven resolutions adopted.

In 2007, Young helped pass HB 4434, which amended the Tax Tribunal Act to provide for the mediation of disputes before the Tax Tribunal. The bill requires that residents receive a notice for blight before being ticketed. The bill also guarantees a dedicated funding source by creating the Michigan Tax Tribunal Fund, which can only be used for the operation of the Tribunal, rather than placing the funding in the General Fund, where it could be used for unrelated purposes. The bill decreases the operating costs of, and provides an additional source of revenue for, the Tax Tribunal.

In 2008, Young helped pass HB 4868, which allows municipalities to waive blight violation fines for first-time offenders, if the fine occurs at an owner-occupied dwelling and the offender has corrected the circumstances for the violation.

2008 also saw Young help pass HB 5842, which increased Sales Tax revenue and brought jobs to the Detroit region by expanding tax credits for the movie industry.

In 2009, Young helped pass HB 4327, the Tisha Prater Act, which guarantees anti-discrimination protections for women affected by pregnancy, childbirth or related medical conditions. The legislation, named for Detroit Police Officer Tisha Prater, followed a 2008 Federal lawsuit filed when Prater was denied paid leave from work after she told the department that she was pregnant. At the time, Detroit Police Department policy required pregnant women to take sick leave, instead of getting light-duty assignments offered to males limited by injuries suffered outside work. The legislation banned job discrimination based on a woman's pregnancy, childbirth or related medical conditions, and mandated paid maternity leave for pregnant police officers and firefighters. The bill passed the Michigan Senate unanimously. Governor Jennifer Granholm's signing of the bill marked the first time that the Governor, the ACLU and Michigan Right to Life came together in one room.

Also in 2009, Young helped pass HB 4986, which amend the Neighborhood Enterprise Zone (NEZ) Act to expand eligibility for NEZ certificates. Owners and developers rehabilitating property located in a NEZ qualify for reduced property taxes.

In 2013, Young helped pass SB 93, which renamed I-375 in Wayne County, as the "102nd  United  States  Colored  Troops  (U.S.C.T.) 
Memorial Highway," in honor of the 102nd Regiment United States Colored Troops, an African American infantry unit of the Union Army during the American Civil War.

In 2014, Young helped pass SB 146, again amending the Neighborhood Enterprise Zone (NEZ) Act to further expand eligibility for NEZ certificates.

In 2016, Young helped pass SB 141, which regulated Michigan's medical marijuana industry.

In 2018, Young helped pass SB 209, which designated a portion of highway M-10 in Wayne County as "Sergeant Collin Rose Memorial Highway," in honor of Sgt. Collin Rose, the first and only member of the Wayne State University Police Department to be killed in the line of duty.

Electoral history

External links
 Young's official Senate Democrats biography page

References

Living people
1984 births
People from Royal Oak, Michigan
Azusa Pacific University alumni
San Bernardino Valley College alumni
Wayne State University alumni
21st-century American politicians
Democratic Party Michigan state senators
Politicians from Detroit
Democratic Party members of the Michigan House of Representatives
African-American state legislators in Michigan
American Pentecostals
21st-century African-American politicians
20th-century African-American people